Burmese traditional festivals are based on the traditional Burmese calendar and dates are largely determined by the moon's phase. Burmese culture is most evident in villages where local festivals are held throughout the year, the most important being the pagoda festival.

Festivals

References

Burmese culture
 
Burma